is a Japanese cooking style that can be summarized as a technique of sauté and simmer. The most common dish made with this technique is Kinpira Gobo, braised burdock root. Kinpira is commonly used to cook root vegetables such as carrots, burdock root, and lotus root; skins of squash such as Kabocha; vegetables such as mushrooms or broccoli; seaweeds such as arame and hijiki; other foods including tofu, capsicums, and wheat gluten (namafu); and meat such as chicken thigh, pork, and beef. The base sauce is made up of soy sauce, mirin, sugar, and chili peppers.

Kinpira is named after the son of Kintarō, a Japanese folk hero.

References

Japanese cuisine
Cooking techniques